Ultimate General is a series of American Civil War computer wargames that focus on tactics and military history. There are currently two titles in the series: Ultimate General: Gettysburg and Ultimate General: Civil War. Both were developed by a Ukrainian company, Game-Labs, and designed by Nick Thomadis, the creator of "DarthMod" (a series of mods that improve the AI in the Total War games) and one of the most well-known modders in the Total War modding community.

Ultimate General: Gettysburg
Ultimate General: Gettysburg was the first game of the series, which allows players to lead thousands of soldiers in the Battle of Gettysburg. According to the developers, the game is unique in "Giving you the chance to be the General of either the Union or Confederate army in the battle of Gettysburg, it allows you to recreate the historical facts or try out many speculative scenarios." It first became available in Steam Early Access on 12 June 2014, and was fully released on 15 October 2014 The game has been updated since release and the latest version, Patch 1.7, was released on 15 July 2016.

The game claims to have accurate maps utilising satellite images and historical charts. Additional game-play features include Custom Battles, where different AI Commanders and the multi-day battles provide replayability. There are also additional custom battles where players can unlock a large number of speculative scenarios that can be played as quick battles, either randomised or with full unit strength and default army deployments. There is also a Multiplayer Experience in which the game has 18 maps for one-on-one matches.

There are differences between the iPad and the computer versions. The game was redesigned to provide usability and playability on tablets, and the user interface was reworked. The campaign here is replaced by 10 missions for each side, and multiplayer is not available.

Ultimate General: Civil War
Ultimate General: Civil War, unlike Gettysburg, offers a campaign system that covers the whole American Civil War from 1861-1865, including historical battles, units and events. The game was released on 16 November 2016 in Steam Early Access. As an early access version, the game was regularly updated, and a "completed version" of the game was released on 14 July 2017. The "final" version of the game, Patch 1.10, was released on 18 May 2018.

The game campaign allows players to participate in more than 50 battles, from small engagements to major battles that can last several days over multiple maps. The player's, and therefore the campaign's, ongoing success is interactively connected to player actions and battle outcomes. Historical battles can be also played separately. As with the previous title, the battle landscapes are hand-drawn, utilising data from satellite and historical maps

The full edition includes well-known conflicts such as Battle of Aquia Creek, Battle of Philippi (West Virginia), 1st Battle of Bull Run, Battle of Shiloh, Battle of Gaines' Mill, Battle of Malvern Hill, 2nd Battle of Bull Run, Battle of Antietam, Battle of Fredericksburg, Battle of Stones River, Battle of Chancellorsville, Battle of Gettysburg, Battle of Chickamauga, Battle of Cold Harbor, and Battle of Richmond. Custom battles also include the ability to play hypothetical battles such as Battle of Washington, and imagined parts of historical conflicts, while also covering additional battles, such as Battle of Spotsylvania Courthouse.

References

External links
 Official homepage
 Official YouTube page
 Game-Labs Forum

2014 video games
Computer wargames
American Civil War video games
Video games set in the United States
Video games set in the 19th century
Video game franchises
Strategy video games
Video games developed in Ukraine
Video game franchises introduced in 2014
IOS games
Linux games
MacOS games
Windows games